Tarasov is a rural locality (a khutor) in Ostrovskoye Rural Settlement, Danilovsky District, Volgograd Oblast, Russia. The population was 34 as of 2010. There are 3 streets.

Geography 
Tarasov is located 53 km northeast of Danilovka (the district's administrative centre) by road. Medvedevo is the nearest rural locality.

References 

Rural localities in Danilovsky District, Volgograd Oblast